Naranpanawe Kandegammedda is a village in Sri Lanka. It is located within Central Province.
Naranpanawe Kandegammedda is a place with a very small population in the province of Central, Sri Lanka which is located in the continent/region of Asia.
Cities, towns and places near Naranpanawe Kandegammedda include Naranpanawa, Naranpanawe Egodagammedda, Naranpanawa Kandegammedda and Naranpanawa Egodagammedda.
The closest major cities include Colombo, Tirunelveli, Nagercoil and Madurai.

See also
List of towns in Central Province, Sri Lanka

References

External links

Populated places in Kandy District